Anadyrsk was an important Russian ostrog (fortified settlement) in far northeastern Siberia from 1649 to 1764.  It was on the Anadyr River, near the head of small-boat navigation, about 300 miles upstream, 12 miles northeast of the present Markovo.

In 1649 Semyon Dezhnyov built a zimov'ye (winter quarters) here after being wrecked on the Pacific coast the previous year. In 1650 Mikhail Stadukhin and Semyon Motora arrived overland from the Kolyma River. In 1659 Kurbat Ivanov took over, built a proper stockade and made major improvements in administration. About 1697, Anadyrsk was the launching place for Vladimir Atlasov's conquest of Kamchatka.  The local Chukchis and Koryaks were warlike, and the post was attacked a number of times. George Kennan reported that its garrison through much of its service was 600 men and a battery of artillery. Its importance declined with the opening of the sea route through Okhotsk to Kamchatka in 1718.  Subsequently, its importance was limited to interactions with the Chukchis. Concluding that attempts to collect tribute from the Chukchis were not a paying proposition, the Russian government of Catherine II ordered Anadyrsk abandoned in 1764.

In 1866, when it was visited by Kennan (at that time only the second non-Russian or non-native in living memory to do so), Anadyrsk consisted of four villages: Markovo (the central one), Pokorukov, Psolkin and Krepost. There were about 200 inhabitants and a priest. Krepost ('fort') was the site of the Anadyrsk fort, on a bank about 30 feet above the level of the river, and at that time consisted of a dozen log cabins, with no trace of the old fortifications visible. Markovo was about 15 versts (16 km) upriver, and Pokorukov a further 20 versts. Kennan described it as the Ultima Thule of Russian civilization.

See also

Chukchi people

References

 Bush, Richard J. (1871) Reindeer, Dogs and Snowshoes: A Journal of Siberian Travel and Explorations Republished Kessinger Publishing, 2005 , .
 Fisher, Raymond H. (ed) (1981) The Voyage of Semen Dezhnev in 1648: Bering's precursor, with selected documents.  Hakluyt Society, London.
 Forsyth, James (1994) A History of the Peoples of Siberia: Russia's North Asian Colony 1581-1990.  Cambridge University Press, 1994 .
 reprint 1986  ; reprint 2007 .
 Lincoln, W. Bruce (2008) The Conquest of a Continent: Siberia and the Russians Cornell University Press. , .

History of Siberia
Fur trade
Defunct towns in Russia
Former populated places in Russia
Populated places established in 1649
Cultural heritage monuments in Chukotka Autonomous Okrug